Sonia Gegenhuber is a retired Australian soccer player who played 75 times (including 60 full international matches) for Australia and was a national captain.

Early life
Gegenhuber grew up in Mannum, South Australia where she began playing soccer alongside her three brothers.

Playing career
After spending time playing in Adelaide for Brahma Lodge, Gegenhuber moved to Queensland. She had stints with Coalstars, Eastern Suburbs and QAS Sting.

Gegenhuber made her debut for Australia in 1989. At the 1995 FIFA Women's World Cup, she made two appearances. She made her final appearance for Australia in 1999, have made 75 appearances, including 60 in full international matches.

Honours
In 2013, Football Federation Australia named Gegenhuber as part their women's team of the decade for the years 1990 to 1999.

In 2018, she was inducted into the FFA Hall of Fame.
2000 Australian Sports Medal

References

1970 births
Living people
Australian women's soccer players
1995 FIFA Women's World Cup players
Australia women's international soccer players
Women's association football defenders
Sportswomen from South Australia